Rissoellidae are a family of minute sea snails, marine gastropod molluscs in the informal group Lower Heterobranchia.

Rissoellidae is the only family within the superfamily Rissoelloidea in the taxonomy of the Gastropoda by Bouchet & Rocroi, 2005.

Genera
Genera within the family Rissoellidae include:
 Cythnia Carpenter, 1864
 Rissoella Gray, 1847 - synonyms: Heterorissoa Iredale, 1912; Jeffreysia Alder [in Forbes & Hanley], 1850

References

External links 
 Powell A. W. B., New Zealand Mollusca, William Collins Publishers Ltd, Auckland, New Zealand 1979 
 ZipCodeZoo

 
Taxa named by John Edward Gray